The 1936 Arizona gubernatorial election took place on November 3, 1936. Incumbent Governor Benjamin Baker Moeur ran for reelection, but he was defeated in the Democratic primary by former judge of the Maricopa County Superior Court Rawghlie Clement Stanford.

Rawghlie Clement Stanford defeated former Governor Thomas Edward Campbell by more than 40 points in the general election, and was sworn into his first and only term as Governor on January 4, 1937, becoming Arizona's fifth Governor.

Democratic primary
The Democratic primary took place on September 8, 1936. Incumbent Governor Benjamin Baker Moeur was opposed in the primary by former Maricopa County Superior Court judge Rawghlie Clement Stanford, who Moeur had defeated the previous election year in 1934.

Candidates
 Benjamin Baker Moeur, incumbent Governor
 Rawghlie Clement Stanford, former judge of the Maricopa County Superior Court

Results

Republican primary
The Republican primary took place on September 8, 1936. Former Governor Thomas Edward Campbell, who was the first Republican to serve as Governor of Arizona, ran for another term after leaving office in 1923. He was challenged by Phoenix Mayor John Hunt Udall.

Candidates
 Thomas Edward Campbell, former Governor
 John Hunt Udall, Mayor of Phoenix

Results

General election

References

1936
1936 United States gubernatorial elections
Gubernatorial
November 1936 events